Hildegunn Øiseth (born 5 December 1966 in Kongsvinger, Norway) is a Norwegian jazz musician (trumpet, flugelhorn and bukkehorn).

Career 
Øiseth has had a number of appearances in both Norway, South Africa and Pakistan, and was hired as trumpeter in the only professional big band in Scandinavia, Bohuslän Big Band (1990–99). She left this big band to develop her own projects, and established in South Afrika (1999–2001). The stay in Africa resulted in two album releases by the band "Uhambo". She was instructor and artist at The Groove Valley JazzCamp in Beiarn 2007, and released her debut album as a solo artist with the Hildring (2009), focusing on the traditional instrument Bukkehorn instrument. Here she plays with musicians like Helge A. Nordbakken (percussion), Nils-Olav Johansen (guitar/vocal), Paolo Vinaccia (percussion), Eirik-André Rydningen (drums), Karl Oluf Wennerberg (drums), Stein Austrud (vocoder), Majken Christiansen (vocal), Tuva Syvertsen (hardingfele/vocal), Mohdi Ahsan Papu (Pakistani flautes), Tore Brunborg (saxophone), Erlend Gjertsen (keyboards, percussion, world stick), Herman Rundberg (guitar/keyboards/percussion/vocals/world stick) and Svein Schultz (bass/keyboards/world stick). The follow up, Stillness (2011), received critical acclaim and here she works alternately with Mats Eilertsen (bass), Thomas Strønen (drums) and the pianists Torbjørn Dyrud and Eyolf Dale.

Discography

Solo works 
2009: Hildring (MTG Music)
2011: Stillness (Losen Records)
2014: Valencia (Losen Records)
2015: Time Is Coming (Losen Records)
2020: Manana (Jazzland Recordings)

Collaborative works 
With Lars Jansson & Bohuslän Big Band
1996: The Blue Pearl (Phono Suecia), plays the music of Lars Jansson
1998: One Poem, One Painting (Imogena Records)

With other projects
2007: Notice (MTG Music), within "Nordic Beat»
2008: Lysmannen (Juni Records), with Geirr Lystrup
2009: Kissing Fools (Hunter Records), with Stina Stenerud
2011: Balggis (Vuelie Records), within "Barut»
2011: Migrations (Vuelie Records), with Øyvind Brække & Trondheim Jazz Orchestra

References

External links 

20th-century Norwegian trumpeters
21st-century Norwegian trumpeters
Norwegian jazz trumpeters
Male trumpeters
Norwegian jazz composers
Losen Records artists
Musicians from Kongsvinger
1966 births
Living people
Male jazz composers
20th-century Norwegian male musicians
21st-century Norwegian male musicians
Trondheim Jazz Orchestra members
Jazzland Recordings (1997) artists